UFC Fight Pass is an American subscription-based video streaming service owned by the UFC's parent company, Zuffa, that launched in December 2013.

History
Fight Pass showcases live and on-demand mixed martial arts, submission grappling, kickboxing, boxing and Thai boxing events. In addition to UFC events (with their flagship pay-per-view events appearing on the service around a month after their initial broadcasts), Fight Pass also includes content from the libraries of PRIDE FC, World Extreme Cagefighting, Strikeforce, Affliction Entertainment, World Fighting Alliance, EliteXC, King of the Cage, Pancrase, Cage Warriors, Shooto and UCMMA.

In September 2014, Invicta FC began live-streaming events on Fight Pass. In February 2016, it was announced Fight Pass would begin streaming kickboxing promotions Glory and K-1, and the Eddie Bravo Invitational submission grappling tournaments.

On December 5, 2019, UFC announced an upgrade which included 1080p video, improved search and multi view for desktop. UFC president Dana White said "The redesigned Fight Pass offers upgrades like 1080p video, multi-view for desktop, improved search, and coming early next year, ‘Downloads to Go,’ so you can watch Fight Pass content without an internet connection. Add in the world's largest fight library with 17,000 fights, every UFC fight ever, and over 1,000 hours of live combat sports, and Fight Pass continues to be a must-have streaming service for combat sports fans". Content included alongside live events and the fight library includes shows such as The Ultimate Fighter, Unleashed, Dana White's Contender Series, Unfiltered, Connected and the popular long running show UFC Now.

On July 22, 2020, it was announced that UFC had rolled out their Fight Pass service in Japan. Kevin Chang, senior vice president for UFC Asia said "Japan is a pioneer in the sport of MMA, with a fan base that is knowledgeable, sophisticated, and always hungry for more". The promotion had also introduced the service to other major territories in Asia, including China and India.

As of February 2021, Invicta FC was pulled from Fight Pass. As many broadcasters have chosen with the current decline of traditional TV Invicta opted to go down the Fight Network route where their events will now broadcast live in the United States and Canada similar to the WWE Network model where full live events is part of a subscription base price.

Although media subscription services tend to experience significant churn, UFC Fight Pass is believed to have approximately 250,000 subscribers globally, as of 2017. In 2020, it was noted that the service has continued to grow 28% year to date. General manager Crowley Sullivan said, "Even without live events for two months, UFC Fight Pass subscriptions are up 28% year-to-date and 23% year-over-year".

In August 2022, it was confirmed that UFC Fight Pass will be released in Brazil in 2023 after the UFC rights with Grupo Globo will expire on the same year. UFC Fight Pass was officially released in Brazil on January 1, 2023.

In 2023, the ADCC Submission Fighting World Championship signed an exclusive multi-year streaming deal with UFC Fight Pass, leaving their previous broadcaster FloSports.

In-house events
On December 16, 2021 UFC Fight Pass produced its first in-house event; UFC Fight Pass Invitational. The event saw four teams of four men compete in grappling matches, including Davi Ramos, James Krause, and Rafael Lovato Jr. The tournament was won by the team representing Legacy Fighting Alliance.

The second UFC Fight Pass Invitational event took place on July 3, 2021 and featured a number of returning competitors along with debutants in another team tournament. This tournament was won by the team representing Anthony Pettis Fighting Championships.

The third UFC Fight Pass Invitational event took place on December 15, 2021 and saw a slight change in format. This event featured an eight-man absolute tournament instead, featuring top grapplers like Nick Rodriguez, Mason Fowler, and Patrick Gaudio. The main event was scheduled to be a superfight between Gordon Ryan and Vinny Magalhães, but Magalhaes withdrew from the match days before the event and was replaced with Nick Rodriguez. Mason Fowler won the absolute tournament and Gordon Ryan won the superfight.

References

External links 
 

Internet television channels
Ultimate Fighting Championship
Internet properties established in 2013
Subscription video streaming services